Shujauddin Malik (born 29 February 1972 in Gujranwala) is a Commonwealth Games gold medal-winning weightlifter from Pakistan. Malik was awarded the Tamgha-i-Imtiaz (Urdu: تمغہ امتیاز) in 2010 for his achievements. He currently holds the Commonwealth Games record in the 85 kg category while lifting 193 kg clean&jerk at Commonwealth Games 2006 in Melbourne.

Career

Commonwealth Games
Malik won Pakistan's 1st and only gold medal at the 2006 Commonwealth Games in Melbourne, Australia winning the 85 kg category.

2010 Games
Malik was chosen as the flag bearer for Pakistan at the opening ceremony. However, at the last minute as the teams were entering the stadium, chef de mission, Dr. Mohammad Ali Shah insisted on carrying the flag himself. According to the weightlifting team's manager, Rashid Mehmood, the team had considered a boycott in protest at the actions of the official but later withdrew their threat after Pakistan Olympic Association chief, Arif Hasan, assured them Shah would be sanctioned for his actions. Prime Minister, Yousuf Raza Gilani has ordered an inquiry into the incident.

Awards
Tamga-e-Imtiaz

References

Living people
Pakistani male weightlifters
Weightlifters at the 2006 Commonwealth Games
Weightlifters at the 2010 Commonwealth Games
Commonwealth Games gold medallists for Pakistan
1972 births
Weightlifters at the 2006 Asian Games
Commonwealth Games medallists in weightlifting
Asian Games competitors for Pakistan
20th-century Pakistani people
21st-century Pakistani people
Medallists at the 2006 Commonwealth Games